"Navras" is a composition and a song from The Matrix Revolutions soundtrack by goa trance band Juno Reactor, whose remix version is composed by Don Davis and  Juno Reactor featuring vocal elements by Lakshmi Shankar and Azam Ali. The song contains an adaption of the Pavamana Mantra found in the Hindu sacred text the Brihadaranyaka Upanishad, section I.iii.28, used in the soundtrack of the movie The Matrix Revolutions.  The song was also a remix of an earlier track called Neodammerung (German for "the twilight of Neo"). The name Navras might refer to the notion of nine rasas (nava rasa) in Sanskrit aesthetics.

asato mā sad gamayatamaso mā jyotir gamayamṛtyor mā amṛtaṁ gamaya

From ignorance lead me to truthFrom darkness lead me to lightFrom death lead me to immortality
--Brhadaranyaka Upanishad, I.iii.28

The track was used by rhythmic gymnasts Simona Peycheva of Bulgaria and Penelope Blackmore of Australia in their respective ribbon routines at the 2004 Athens Olympic Games.

The Calgary Flames have used this song since the 2004 Stanley Cup Finals against the Tampa Bay Lightning. Used as the intro right before the Flames take the ice, this song has been used in 2004, 2006, 2007, 2008, 2009, 2015, 2017, 2019, 2020 and 2022

On 28 January 2022 "Navras" was released as single with 3 remixes from Bliss, Reaky Reakson and System Of The Abyss.

Personnel
Don Davis – conductor
Azam Ali – vocals
Lakshmi Shankar – vocals
Deepak Ram – vocals, flute
Mabi Thobejane – vocals, percussion
Zig Gron – editing
Greg Hunter – engineer
Scott Oyster – engineer

See also 
Rasa (aesthetics)
Pavamana Mantra

References

2003 compositions
2003 songs
Apocalyptic music
Compositions in D minor
Songs written for films
The Matrix (franchise) music